The Pilipino Series banknotes is the name used to refer to Philippine banknotes and coins issued by the Central Bank of the Philippines from 1969 to 1973, during the term of President Ferdinand Marcos. It was succeeded by the Ang Bagong Lipunan Series of banknotes, to which it shared a similar design. The lowest denomination of the series is 1-piso and the highest is 100-piso.

This series represented a radical change from the English series. The bills underwent Filipinization and a design change.

After the declaration of Proclamation № 1081 on September 23, 1972, the Central Bank demonetized all the existing banknotes (both the English and Pilipino series) on March 1, 1974, pursuant to Presidential Decree No. 378. All of the unissued banknotes were sent back to the De La Rue plant in London for overprinting the watermark area with the words "ANG BAGONG LIPUNAN" and an oval geometric safety design.

Banknotes

Coins

Designs

Banknotes

1 piso
Colored blue, the main design of the note features a portrait of the national hero of the Philippines José Rizal on the front and the Declaration of Philippine Independence on the back.

5 piso
Colored green, the main design of the note features a portrait of Filipino revolutionary Andres Bonifacio on the front and a scene of the Blood Compact of the Katipuneros on the back

10 piso
Colored brown, the principal design on the note features a portrait of Apolinario Mabini on the front and the Barasoain Church, site of the drafting of the Malolos Constitution and the inauguration of the First Philippine Republic on the back.

20 piso
Colored orange, the main design of the note features a portrait of Philippine president Manuel L. Quezon on the front and the Malacañang Palace, the official residence and workplace of the President of the Philippines on the back.

50 piso
Colored red, the main design of the note features a portrait of Philippine president Sergio Osmeña on the front and the Legislative Building (today the National Museum of Fine Arts) on the back.

100 piso
Colored violet, the principal design of the note features a portrait of Philippine president Manuel A. Roxas on the front and the Former headquarters of the Bangko Sentral ng Pilipinas on the back.

Coins

1 sentimo
Struck in aluminium, the 1 sentimo coin features a profile of Lapu-Lapu on the obverse and the Coat of arms of the Philippines on the reverse.

5 sentimos
Sturck in brass, the 5 sentimos coin features a profile of Melchora Aquino on the obverse and the Coat of arms of the Philippines on the reverse.

10 sentimos
Struck in nickel-brass, the 10 sentimos coin features a profile of Francisco Baltazar on the obverse and the Coat of arms of the Philippines on the reverse.

25 sentimos
Struck in nickel-brass, the 25 sentimos coin features a profile of Juan Luna on the obverse and the Coat of arms of the Philippines on the reverse.

50 sentimos
Struck in nickel-brass, the 50 sentimos coin features a profile of Marcelo H. del Pilar on the obverse and the Coat of arms of the Philippines on the reverse.

1 piso
Struck in nickel-brass, the 1 piso coin feaures a profile of the national hero of the Philippines José Rizal on the obverse and the Coat of arms of the Philippines on the reverse.

References

 Pilipino Series in philmoney.blogspot.com

External links
 Philippine Banknotes and Coins
 Philippine Coins News & Updates

Philippines currency history
Banknotes of the Philippines